Bridgewater Center is a census-designated place (CDP) in the west-central part of Bridgewater Township, Somerset County, New Jersey, United States. It was first listed as a CDP prior to the 2020 census.

Within Bridgewater Township, the community is bordered to the northeast by Green Knoll and to the southwest by Bradley Gardens. To the south it is bordered by the boroughs of Raritan and Somerville. It is bordered to the northwest by Bedminster Township and to the west by Branchburg Township.

Interstate 287 forms the northeast border of the CDP, separating it from Green Knoll, while U.S. Route 22 forms the southern border with Somerville. Farther to the west, New Jersey Route 28 (Easton Turnpike) forms the CDP's border with Raritan and Bradley Gardens.

Demographics

References 

Census-designated places in Somerset County, New Jersey
Census-designated places in New Jersey
Bridgewater Township, New Jersey